The women's sprint competition in orienteering at the 2009 World Games took place on 18 July 2009 at the Chengcing Lake in Kaohsiung, Taiwan.

Competition format
A total of 36 athletes entered the competition. Every athlete had to check in at control points, which were located across the course.

Results

References

External links
 Results on IOF website

Orienteering at the 2009 World Games